Cape Labelle Creek is a stream in the U.S. state of Washington.

Cape Labelle Creek derives its name from Kate Labelle, an early settler.

See also
List of rivers of Washington

References

Rivers of Okanogan County, Washington
Rivers of Washington (state)